Mount Beaufort is a mountain located on Ellesmere Island, Nunavut, Canada and was named after Francis Beaufort. The mountain was first sighted by Elisha Kane in 1845 and named Mount Francis Beaufort.

References
Geographical Names of the Ellesmere Island National Park Reserve and Vicinity by Geoffrey Hattersley-Smith (1998) 

Arctic Cordillera
Mountains of Canada under 1000 metres